Heikki Väisänen (born 7 January 1943) is a Finnish ski jumper. He competed in the normal hill event at the 1968 Winter Olympics.

References

External links
 

1943 births
Living people
Finnish male ski jumpers
Olympic ski jumpers of Finland
Ski jumpers at the 1968 Winter Olympics
People from Kajaani
Sportspeople from Kainuu
20th-century Finnish people